Phyllonorycter zonochares is a moth of the family Gracillariidae. It is known from Jammu and Kashmir, India.

References

zonochares
Moths of Asia
Moths described in 1933